Francesco Nerli, iuniore (12 June 1636 – 8 April 1708) was a Roman Catholic cardinal.

Biography
On 6 Jul 1670, he was consecrated bishop by Carlo Carafa della Spina, Cardinal-Priest of Santa Susanna, with Giambattista Spínola (seniore), Archbishop of Genoa, and Federico Baldeschi Colonna, Titular Archbishop of Caesarea in Cappadocia, serving as co-consecrators.

Episcopal succession

References

External links and additional sources
 (for Chronology of Bishops) 
 (for Chronology of Bishops) 

1636 births
1708 deaths
17th-century Italian cardinals
Apostolic Nuncios to France
Apostolic Nuncios to Poland
18th-century Italian cardinals
17th-century Italian Roman Catholic archbishops